SS Capillo was a Design 1022 cargo ship built for the United States Shipping Board immediately after World War I.

History
She was laid down at yard number 1523 at the Philadelphia, Pennsylvania shipyard of the American International Shipbuilding Corporation, one of 110 Design 1022 cargo ships built for the United States Shipping Board. She was completed in 1920 and named the SS Capillo. In 1921, she was purchased by the Pioneer Steamship Company, Philadelphia. In 1922, she was returned to the United States Shipping Board.

The Japanese commenced near simultaneous attacks against U.S. forces in the Philippines, Guam, Wake Island, and Pearl Harbor; and against British and allied forces in Singapore and Hong Kong. On 8 December 1941, Japanese planes tasked with attacking shipping in Manila Bay, bombed and set her ablaze; she was then abandoned. On 11 December 1941, she was partially scuttled by a U.S. Army demolition party off Corregidor. On 29 December 1941, Japanese planes from the Takao Kokutai and the 1st Kokutai bombed Corregidor for the first time, setting her hulk ablaze. The Philippine freighter Don Jose is also set on fire; the presidential yacht BRP Banahaw (ex-Casania) is sunk; and the steamship Bicol and motor vessel Aloha are both scuttled. Six members of her crew were sent to Japanese POW camps.

References

Bibliography

External links
 EFC Design 1022: Illustrations

1920 ships
Ships built in Philadelphia
Merchant ships of the United States
Maritime incidents in December 1941
Design 1022 ships